The 1983 VFL season was the 87th season of the Victorian Football League (VFL), the highest level senior Australian rules football competition in Victoria.

The season featured twelve clubs, ran from 26 March until 24 September, and comprised a 22-game home-and-away season followed by a finals series featuring the top five clubs. 

Prior to the season, the South Melbourne Football Club, which had played its home games in Sydney, New South Wales in 1982, formally relocated its operations to Sydney and was renamed the Sydney Swans. 

The premiership was won by the Hawthorn Football Club for the fifth time, after it defeated  by 83 points in the 1983 VFL Grand Final.

Night series
 defeated  14.16 (100) to 10.6 (66) in the final.

Premiership season

Round 1

|- bgcolor="#CCCCFF"
| Home team
| Home team score
| Away team
| Away team score
| Venue
| Crowd
| Date
|- bgcolor="#FFFFFF"
| 
| 14.16 (100)
| 
| 12.15 (87)
| Arden Street Oval
| 18,496
| 26 March 1983
|- bgcolor="#FFFFFF"
| 
| 16.16 (112)
| 
| 20.11 (131)
| Junction Oval
| 15,626
| 26 March 1983
|- bgcolor="#FFFFFF"
| 
| 20.16 (136)
| 
| 11.10 (76)
| Princes Park
| 28,108
| 26 March 1983
|- bgcolor="#FFFFFF"
| 
| 19.11 (125)
| 
| 20.15 (135)
| MCG
| 72,274
| 26 March 1983
|- bgcolor="#FFFFFF"
| 
| 15.16 (106)
| 
| 11.9 (75)
| VFL Park
| 18,377
| 26 March 1983
|- bgcolor="#FFFFFF"
| 
| 17.9 (111)
| 
| 15.20 (110)
| SCG
| 12,001
| 27 March 1983

Round 2

|- bgcolor="#CCCCFF"
| Home team
| Home team score
| Away team
| Away team score
| Venue
| Crowd
| Date
|- bgcolor="#FFFFFF"
| 
| 14.12 (96)
| 
| 15.11 (101)
| Victoria Park
| 34,851
| 2 April 1983
|- bgcolor="#FFFFFF"
| 
| 15.10 (100)
| 
| 18.11 (119)
| MCG
| 41,889
| 2 April 1983
|- bgcolor="#FFFFFF"
| 
| 14.15 (99)
| 
| 12.10 (82)
| Western Oval
| 20,414
| 2 April 1983
|- bgcolor="#FFFFFF"
| 
| 9.16 (70)
| 
| 5.15 (45)
| Princes Park
| 16,159
| 4 April 1983
|- bgcolor="#FFFFFF"
| 
| 20.11 (131)
| 
| 10.10 (70)
| Windy Hill
| 27,566
| 4 April 1983
|- bgcolor="#FFFFFF"
| 
| 6.7 (43)
| 
| 12.16 (88)
| VFL Park
| 23,788
| 4 April 1983

Round 3

|- bgcolor="#CCCCFF"
| Home team
| Home team score
| Away team
| Away team score
| Venue
| Crowd
| Date
|- bgcolor="#FFFFFF"
| 
| 13.16 (94)
| 
| 6.10 (46)
| Kardinia Park
| 23,643
| 9 April 1983
|- bgcolor="#FFFFFF"
| 
| 16.15 (111)
| 
| 11.13 (79)
| Western Oval
| 20,608
| 9 April 1983
|- bgcolor="#FFFFFF"
| 
| 6.6 (42)
| 
| 26.15 (171)
| Moorabbin Oval
| 19,227
| 9 April 1983
|- bgcolor="#FFFFFF"
| 
| 14.13 (97)
| 
| 7.14 (56)
| Junction Oval
| 19,823
| 9 April 1983
|- bgcolor="#FFFFFF"
| 
| 13.19 (97)
| 
| 11.21 (87)
| VFL Park
| 69,596
| 9 April 1983
|- bgcolor="#FFFFFF"
| 
| 5.15 (45)
| 
| 27.23 (185)
| SCG
| 11,831
| 10 April 1983

Round 4

|- bgcolor="#CCCCFF"
| Home team
| Home team score
| Away team
| Away team score
| Venue
| Crowd
| Date
|- bgcolor="#FFFFFF"
| 
| 18.19 (127)
| 
| 14.19 (103)
| Arden Street Oval
| 14,822
| 16 April 1983
|- bgcolor="#FFFFFF"
| 
| 17.23 (125)
| 
| 6.16 (52)
| Junction Oval
| 10,738
| 16 April 1983
|- bgcolor="#FFFFFF"
| 
| 12.25 (97)
| 
| 17.16 (118)
| Princes Park
| 16,026
| 16 April 1983
|- bgcolor="#FFFFFF"
| 
| 20.21 (141)
| 
| 17.15 (117)
| Windy Hill
| 27,888
| 16 April 1983
|- bgcolor="#FFFFFF"
| 
| 13.12 (90)
| 
| 14.15 (99)
| MCG
| 38,544
| 16 April 1983
|- bgcolor="#FFFFFF"
| 
| 11.13 (79)
| 
| 13.12 (90)
| VFL Park
| 20,826
| 16 April 1983

Round 5

|- bgcolor="#CCCCFF"
| Home team
| Home team score
| Away team
| Away team score
| Venue
| Crowd
| Date
|- bgcolor="#FFFFFF"
| 
| 9.19 (73)
| 
| 14.11 (95)
| Victoria Park
| 28,506
| 23 April 1983
|- bgcolor="#FFFFFF"
| 
| 9.11 (65)
| 
| 18.17 (125)
| Princes Park
| 25,971
| 23 April 1983
|- bgcolor="#FFFFFF"
| 
| 24.16 (160)
| 
| 21.11 (137)
| SCG
| 11,276
| 24 April 1983
|- bgcolor="#FFFFFF"
| 
| 16.14 (110)
| 
| 18.13 (121)
| Kardinia Park
| 27,645
| 25 April 1983
|- bgcolor="#FFFFFF"
| 
| 17.12 (114)
| 
| 18.8 (116)
| MCG
| 51,651
| 25 April 1983
|- bgcolor="#FFFFFF"
| 
| 20.8 (128)
| 
| 17.21 (123)
| VFL Park
| 47,722
| 25 April 1983

Round 6

|- bgcolor="#CCCCFF"
| Home team
| Home team score
| Away team
| Away team score
| Venue
| Crowd
| Date
|- bgcolor="#FFFFFF"
| 
| 18.18 (126)
| 
| 12.21 (93)
| MCG
| 22,590
| 30 April 1983
|- bgcolor="#FFFFFF"
| 
| 27.19 (181)
| 
| 7.7 (49)
| Windy Hill
| 25,151
| 30 April 1983
|- bgcolor="#FFFFFF"
| 
| 19.16 (130)
| 
| 15.18 (108)
| Victoria Park
| 28,016
| 30 April 1983
|- bgcolor="#FFFFFF"
| 
| 12.13 (85)
| 
| 14.11 (95)
| Princes Park
| 25,480
| 30 April 1983
|- bgcolor="#FFFFFF"
| 
| 15.12 (102)
| 
| 22.11 (143)
| Moorabbin Oval
| 16,154
| 30 April 1983
|- bgcolor="#FFFFFF"
| 
| 12.16 (88)
| 
| 15.16 (106)
| VFL Park
| 33,096
| 30 April 1983

Round 7

|- bgcolor="#CCCCFF"
| Home team
| Home team score
| Away team
| Away team score
| Venue
| Crowd
| Date
|- bgcolor="#FFFFFF"
| 
| 13.13 (91)
| 
| 21.16 (142)
| Princes Park
| 13,945
| 7 May 1983
|- bgcolor="#FFFFFF"
| 
| 11.10 (76)
| 
| 9.13 (67)
| Junction Oval
| 18,770
| 7 May 1983
|- bgcolor="#FFFFFF"
| 
| 16.16 (112)
| 
| 21.11 (137)
| MCG
| 49,707
| 7 May 1983
|- bgcolor="#FFFFFF"
| 
| 11.16 (82)
| 
| 14.4 (88)
| Western Oval
| 31,479
| 7 May 1983
|- bgcolor="#FFFFFF"
| 
| 16.12 (108)
| 
| 11.9 (75)
| VFL Park
| 25,192
| 7 May 1983
|- bgcolor="#FFFFFF"
| 
| 18.10 (118)
| 
| 22.17 (149)
| SCG
| 15,432
| 8 May 1983

Round 8

Round 9

|- bgcolor="#CCCCFF"
| Home team
| Home team score
| Away team
| Away team score
| Venue
| Crowd
| Date
|- bgcolor="#FFFFFF"
| 
| 12.12 (84)
| 
| 18.16 (124)
| Kardinia Park
| 21,802
| 21 May 1983
|- bgcolor="#FFFFFF"
| 
| 22.17 (149)
| 
| 17.13 (115)
| Windy Hill
| 19,850
| 21 May 1983
|- bgcolor="#FFFFFF"
| 
| 15.14 (104)
| 
| 14.12 (96)
| Princes Park
| 30,750
| 21 May 1983
|- bgcolor="#FFFFFF"
| 
| 16.12 (108)
| 
| 13.15 (93)
| Moorabbin Oval
| 20,686
| 21 May 1983
|- bgcolor="#FFFFFF"
| 
| 13.21 (99)
| 
| 22.13 (145)
| VFL Park
| 22,336
| 21 May 1983
|- bgcolor="#FFFFFF"
| 
| 18.13 (121)
| 
| 14.16 (100)
| SCG
| 15,305
| 22 May 1983

Round 10

|- bgcolor="#CCCCFF"
| Home team
| Home team score
| Away team
| Away team score
| Venue
| Crowd
| Date
|- bgcolor="#FFFFFF"
| 
| 16.10 (106)
| 
| 14.10 (94)
| MCG
| 21,047
| 28 May 1983
|- bgcolor="#FFFFFF"
| 
| 17.26 (128)
| 
| 11.16 (82)
| Western Oval
| 19,247
| 28 May 1983
|- bgcolor="#FFFFFF"
| 
| 15.19 (109)
| 
| 15.7 (97)
| Windy Hill
| 20,782
| 28 May 1983
|- bgcolor="#FFFFFF"
| 
| 10.17 (77)
| 
| 13.15 (93)
| Victoria Park
| 32,820
| 28 May 1983
|- bgcolor="#FFFFFF"
| 
| 29.19 (193)
| 
| 11.16 (82)
| Arden Street Oval
| 22,776
| 28 May 1983
|- bgcolor="#FFFFFF"
| 
| 16.13 (109)
| 
| 27.9 (171)
| VFL Park
| 23,988
| 28 May 1983

Round 11

|- bgcolor="#CCCCFF"
| Home team
| Home team score
| Away team
| Away team score
| Venue
| Crowd
| Date
|- bgcolor="#FFFFFF"
| 
| 18.17 (125)
| 
| 20.19 (139)
| MCG
| 25,249
| 4 June 1983
|- bgcolor="#FFFFFF"
| 
| 20.16 (136)
| 
| 16.18 (114)
| Junction Oval
| 16,153
| 4 June 1983
|- bgcolor="#FFFFFF"
| 
| 12.16 (88)
| 
| 14.11 (95)
| Princes Park
| 13,465
| 4 June 1983
|- bgcolor="#FFFFFF"
| 
| 21.18 (144)
| 
| 24.16 (160)
| Moorabbin Oval
| 25,153
| 4 June 1983
|- bgcolor="#FFFFFF"
| 
| 15.11 (101)
| 
| 19.12 (126)
| VFL Park
| 60,619
| 4 June 1983
|- bgcolor="#FFFFFF"
| 
| 17.19 (121)
| 
| 15.12 (102)
| SCG
| 10,710
| 5 June 1983

Round 12

|- bgcolor="#CCCCFF"
| Home team
| Home team score
| Away team
| Away team score
| Venue
| Crowd
| Date
|- bgcolor="#FFFFFF"
| 
| 15.12 (102)
| 
| 14.7 (91)
| Western Oval
| 25,382
| 11 June 1983
|- bgcolor="#FFFFFF"
| 
| 15.14 (104)
| 
| 20.15 (135)
| Moorabbin Oval
| 15,467
| 11 June 1983
|- bgcolor="#FFFFFF"
| 
| 25.17 (167)
| 
| 21.8 (134)
| Princes Park
| 20,559
| 11 June 1983
|- bgcolor="#FFFFFF"
| 
| 23.18 (156)
| 
| 13.5 (83)
| Windy Hill
| 20,535
| 13 June 1983
|- bgcolor="#FFFFFF"
| 
| 21.15 (141)
| 
| 13.13 (91)
| MCG
| 48,243
| 13 June 1983
|- bgcolor="#FFFFFF"
| 
| 12.15 (87)
| 
| 10.8 (68)
| VFL Park
| 55,380
| 13 June 1983

Round 13

|- bgcolor="#CCCCFF"
| Home team
| Home team score
| Away team
| Away team score
| Venue
| Crowd
| Date
|- bgcolor="#FFFFFF"
| 
| 13.13 (91)
| 
| 21.12 (138)
| VFL Park
| 30,616
| 18 June 1983
|- bgcolor="#FFFFFF"
| 
| 15.11 (101)
| 
| 13.7 (85)
| Kardinia Park
| 25,808
| 18 June 1983
|- bgcolor="#FFFFFF"
| 
| 18.15 (123)
| 
| 15.19 (109)
| MCG
| 28,468
| 18 June 1983
|- bgcolor="#FFFFFF"
| 
| 34.16 (220)
| 
| 10.10 (70)
| Junction Oval
| 19,770
| 18 June 1983
|- bgcolor="#FFFFFF"
| 
| 26.15 (171)
| 
| 12.10 (82)
| Princes Park
| 23,710
| 18 June 1983
|- bgcolor="#FFFFFF"
| 
| 11.12 (78)
| 
| 15.20 (110)
| SCG
| 10,084
| 19 June 1983

Round 14

|- bgcolor="#CCCCFF"
| Home team
| Home team score
| Away team
| Away team score
| Venue
| Crowd
| Date
|- bgcolor="#FFFFFF"
| 
| 11.16 (82)
| 
| 7.8 (50)
| Arden Street Oval
| 7,408
| 25 June 1983
|- bgcolor="#FFFFFF"
| 
| 21.17 (143)
| 
| 9.20 (74)
| Princes Park
| 8,190
| 25 June 1983
|- bgcolor="#FFFFFF"
| 
| 8.10 (58)
| 
| 9.11 (65)
| Windy Hill
| 22,925
| 25 June 1983
|- bgcolor="#FFFFFF"
| 
| 14.15 (99)
| 
| 12.13 (85)
| MCG
| 19,306
| 25 June 1983
|- bgcolor="#FFFFFF"
| 
| 15.10 (100)
| 
| 6.9 (45)
| Victoria Park
| 27,778
| 25 June 1983
|- bgcolor="#FFFFFF"
| 
| 11.4 (70)
| 
| 10.9 (69)
| VFL Park
| 17,339
| 25 June 1983

Round 15

|- bgcolor="#CCCCFF"
| Home team
| Home team score
| Away team
| Away team score
| Venue
| Crowd
| Date
|- bgcolor="#FFFFFF"
| 
| 9.6 (60)
| 
| 13.11 (89)
| VFL Park
| 15,750
| 2 July 1983
|- bgcolor="#FFFFFF"
| 
| 9.13 (67)
| 
| 15.16 (106)
| Princes Park
| 19,300
| 2 July 1983
|- bgcolor="#FFFFFF"
| 
| 9.14 (68)
| 
| 18.12 (120)
| Kardinia Park
| 11,459
| 2 July 1983
|- bgcolor="#FFFFFF"
| 
| 16.8 (104)
| 
| 13.9 (87)
| Victoria Park
| 33,614
| 2 July 1983
|- bgcolor="#FFFFFF"
| 
| 16.18 (114)
| 
| 21.12 (138)
| MCG
| 23,622
| 2 July 1983
|- bgcolor="#FFFFFF"
| 
| 23.9 (147)
| 
| 17.15 (117)
| SCG
| 10,315
| 3 July 1983

Round 16

|- bgcolor="#CCCCFF"
| Home team
| Home team score
| Away team
| Away team score
| Venue
| Crowd
| Date
|- bgcolor="#FFFFFF"
| 
| 12.12 (84)
| 
| 15.14 (104)
| Western Oval
| 15,006
| 9 July 1983
|- bgcolor="#FFFFFF"
| 
| 19.14 (128)
| 
| 16.11 (107)
| Arden Street Oval
| 22,340
| 9 July 1983
|- bgcolor="#FFFFFF"
| 
| 13.11 (89)
| 
| 18.16 (124)
| VFL Park
| 31,757
| 9 July 1983
|- bgcolor="#FFFFFF"
| 
| 20.9 (129)
| 
| 14.16 (100)
| Moorabbin Oval
| 17,861
| 16 July 1983
|- bgcolor="#FFFFFF"
| 
| 10.19 (79)
| 
| 10.13 (73)
| MCG
| 34,155
| 16 July 1983
|- bgcolor="#FFFFFF"
| 
| 19.23 (137)
| 
| 14.16 (100)
| Princes Park
| 28,595
| 16 July 1983

Round 17

|- bgcolor="#CCCCFF"
| Home team
| Home team score
| Away team
| Away team score
| Venue
| Crowd
| Date
|- bgcolor="#FFFFFF"
| 
| 24.8 (152)
| 
| 14.14 (98)
| VFL Park
| 41,098
| 23 July 1983
|- bgcolor="#FFFFFF"
| 
| 11.16 (82)
| 
| 22.14 (146)
| MCG
| 31,084
| 23 July 1983
|- bgcolor="#FFFFFF"
| 
| 16.11 (107)
| 
| 18.17 (125)
| Western Oval
| 20,708
| 23 July 1983
|- bgcolor="#FFFFFF"
| 
| 11.7 (73)
| 
| 15.18 (108)
| Kardinia Park
| 17,657
| 23 July 1983
|- bgcolor="#FFFFFF"
| 
| 20.18 (138)
| 
| 22.17 (149)
| Junction Oval
| 15,335
| 23 July 1983
|- bgcolor="#FFFFFF"
| 
| 18.17 (125)
| 
| 16.16 (112)
| SCG
| 11,094
| 24 July 1983

Round 18

|- bgcolor="#CCCCFF"
| Home team
| Home team score
| Away team
| Away team score
| Venue
| Crowd
| Date
|- bgcolor="#FFFFFF"
| 
| 6.14 (50)
| 
| 19.10 (124)
| Windy Hill
| 18,050
| 30 July 1983
|- bgcolor="#FFFFFF"
| 
| 12.10 (82)
| 
| 9.19 (73)
| Victoria Park
| 20,743
| 30 July 1983
|- bgcolor="#FFFFFF"
| 
| 17.17 (119)
| 
| 11.9 (75)
| Princes Park
| 17,868
| 30 July 1983
|- bgcolor="#FFFFFF"
| 
| 11.15 (81)
| 
| 14.14 (98)
| Moorabbin Oval
| 20,218
| 30 July 1983
|- bgcolor="#FFFFFF"
| 
| 12.18 (90)
| 
| 15.7 (97)
| Arden Street Oval
| 17,720
| 30 July 1983
|- bgcolor="#FFFFFF"
| 
| 7.7 (49)
| 
| 16.15 (111)
| VFL Park
| 14,718
| 30 July 1983

Round 19

|- bgcolor="#CCCCFF"
| Home team
| Home team score
| Away team
| Away team score
| Venue
| Crowd
| Date
|- bgcolor="#FFFFFF"
| 
| 10.15 (75)
| 
| 20.21 (141)
| SCG
| 12,752
| 5 August 1983
|- bgcolor="#FFFFFF"
| 
| 22.29 (161)
| 
| 11.9 (75)
| Junction Oval
| 13,870
| 6 August 1983
|- bgcolor="#FFFFFF"
| 
| 23.18 (156)
| 
| 16.14 (110)
| Windy Hill
| 19,315
| 6 August 1983
|- bgcolor="#FFFFFF"
| 
| 25.18 (168)
| 
| 8.13 (61)
| Princes Park
| 19,203
| 6 August 1983
|- bgcolor="#FFFFFF"
| 
| 11.13 (79)
| 
| 13.11 (89)
| MCG
| 81,966
| 6 August 1983
|- bgcolor="#FFFFFF"
| 
| 10.11 (71)
| 
| 25.14 (164)
| VFL Park
| 12,028
| 6 August 1983

Round 20

|- bgcolor="#CCCCFF"
| Home team
| Home team score
| Away team
| Away team score
| Venue
| Crowd
| Date
|- bgcolor="#FFFFFF"
| 
| 28.14 (182)
| 
| 18.12 (120)
| Victoria Park
| 18,772
| 13 August 1983
|- bgcolor="#FFFFFF"
| 
| 16.20 (116)
| 
| 11.18 (84)
| Arden Street Oval
| 11,093
| 13 August 1983
|- bgcolor="#FFFFFF"
| 
| 19.11 (125)
| 
| 14.15 (99)
| Western Oval
| 14,688
| 13 August 1983
|- bgcolor="#FFFFFF"
| 
| 19.10 (124)
| 
| 21.15 (141)
| MCG
| 38,620
| 13 August 1983
|- bgcolor="#FFFFFF"
| 
| 15.22 (112)
| 
| 20.9 (129)
| Princes Park
| 28,504
| 13 August 1983
|- bgcolor="#FFFFFF"
| 
| 9.11 (65)
| 
| 21.14 (140)
| VFL Park
| 21,811
| 13 August 1983

Round 21

|- bgcolor="#CCCCFF"
| Home team
| Home team score
| Away team
| Away team score
| Venue
| Crowd
| Date
|- bgcolor="#FFFFFF"
| 
| 18.18 (126)
| 
| 13.15 (93)
| Princes Park
| 32,610
| 20 August 1983
|- bgcolor="#FFFFFF"
| 
| 13.16 (94)
| 
| 16.4 (100)
| Moorabbin Oval
| 15,680
| 20 August 1983
|- bgcolor="#FFFFFF"
| 
| 19.13 (127)
| 
| 7.21 (63)
| Junction Oval
| 24,104
| 20 August 1983
|- bgcolor="#FFFFFF"
| 
| 25.22 (172)
| 
| 8.9 (57)
| VFL Park
| 21,192
| 20 August 1983
|- bgcolor="#FFFFFF"
| 
| 12.11 (83)
| 
| 26.9 (165)
| Kardinia Park
| 20,110
| 20 August 1983
|- bgcolor="#FFFFFF"
| 
| 10.13 (73)
| 
| 15.24 (114)
| SCG
| 11,475
| 21 August 1983

Round 22

|- bgcolor="#CCCCFF"
| Home team
| Home team score
| Away team
| Away team score
| Venue
| Crowd
| Date
|- bgcolor="#FFFFFF"
| 
| 11.11 (77)
| 
| 24.13 (157)
| Kardinia Park
| 11,214
| 27 August 1983
|- bgcolor="#FFFFFF"
| 
| 17.12 (114)
| 
| 10.12 (72)
| Western Oval
| 13,369
| 27 August 1983
|- bgcolor="#FFFFFF"
| 
| 24.11 (155)
| 
| 14.8 (92)
| Victoria Park
| 19,016
| 27 August 1983
|- bgcolor="#FFFFFF"
| 
| 21.22 (148)
| 
| 10.15 (75)
| Arden Street Oval
| 10,603
| 27 August 1983
|- bgcolor="#FFFFFF"
| 
| 12.21 (93)
| 
| 19.13 (127)
| MCG
| 27,310
| 27 August 1983
|- bgcolor="#FFFFFF"
| 
| 18.10 (118)
| 
| 8.19 (67)
| VFL Park
| 64,232
| 27 August 1983

Ladder

Finals

Elimination Finals

|- bgcolor="#CCCCFF"
| Home team
| Score
| Away team
| Score
| Venue
| Attendance
| Date
|- bgcolor="#FFFFFF"
| 
| 17.12 (114)
| 
| 12.9 (81)
| Waverley Park
| 65,881
| Saturday, 3 September

Qualifying final

|- bgcolor="#CCCCFF"
| Home team
| Score
| Away team
| Score
| Venue
| Attendance
| Date
|- bgcolor="#FFFFFF"
| 
| 19.13 (127)
| 
| 19.9 (123)
| MCG
| 58,288
| Saturday, 3 September

Semi-finals

|- bgcolor="#CCCCFF"
| Home team
| Score
| Away team
| Score
| Venue
| Attendance
| Date
|- bgcolor="#FFFFFF"
| 
| 6.12 (48)
| 
| 13.10 (88)
| Waverley Park
| 41,063
| Saturday, 10 September
|- bgcolor="#FFFFFF"
| 
| 12.14 (86)
| 
| 16.13 (109)
| MCG
| 81,090  
| Saturday, 10 September

Preliminary final

|- bgcolor="#CCCCFF"
| Home team
| Score
| Away team
| Score
| Venue
| Attendance
| Date
|- bgcolor="#FFFFFF"
| 
| 12.6 (78)
| 
| 25.14 (164)
| Waverley Park
| 63,785 
| Saturday, 17 September

Grand Final

|- bgcolor="#CCCCFF"
| Home team
| Score
| Away team
| Score
| Venue
| Attendance
| Date
|- bgcolor="#FFFFFF"
| 
| 20.20 (140)
| 
| 8.9 (57)
| MCG
| 110,332
| Saturday, 24 September

Attendance
A total of 3,631,042 people attended VFL matches during the 1983 season, an average of about 26,312 per game (including finals matches). A combined total of 420,439 attended finals matches in 1983, an average of 70,073 per finals match. The largest attendance for a home and away game was Richmond versus Collingwood at the MCG, the attendance figure was 81,966.

Awards
 The Brownlow Medal was awarded to Ross Glendinning of North Melbourne.
 The Coleman Medal was awarded to Bernie Quinlan of Fitzroy.
 The VFL Players Association MVP Award, now known as the Leigh Matthews Trophy, was awarded to Terry Daniher of Essendon.
 The Norm Smith Medal was awarded to Colin Robertson of Hawthorn.
 The "Wooden Spoon" was "awarded" to St Kilda.
 The under 19s premiership won by Melbourne
 The reserves premiership was won by Essendon. Essendon 19.14 (128) defeated Collingwood 15.9 (99) in the grand final, held as a curtain-raiser to the seniors Grand Final on 24 September.

Notable events
 In Round 4, St Kilda played Paul Morwood, Jack Lynch and Silvio Foschini without their clearances from the Sydney Swans being finalised. Had they beaten Geelong, they would have forfeited the points under the laws at the time.
 North Melbourne's 150-point loss to Fitzroy in Round 13 more than doubled the previous biggest loss by a minor premier of 69 points, which had occurred in 1952 and 1974.
 In Fitzroy's Round 17 game with St Kilda, a record quarter aggregate of 19.7 (121) – Fitzroy 12.6 (78), St. Kilda 7.1 (43) – was kicked during the second quarter.
 In Round 19, Kevin Bartlett became the first player to play 400 VFL games, after having in Round 11 of 1981 become the first to reach 350 games.

See also
 McIntyre "final five" system

References

Sources
 Stephen Rodgers: Every Game Ever Played VFL/AFL Results 1897–1991 3rd Edition 1992. Penguin Books Australia .
 1983 Season - AFL Tables

1983
VFL season